Vikramarkudu is a 2006 Indian Telugu-language action film directed by S. S. Rajamouli who co-wrote the film with V. Vijayendra Prasad. The film stars Ravi Teja and Anushka Shetty. It follows a thief who discovers a girl insisting he is her father, while a series of events connect his life to her actual father, who is his look-alike. The film's music was composed by M. M. Keeravani with cinematography and editing by Sarvesh Murari and Kotagiri Venkateswara Rao respectively.

Vikramarkudu was released on 23 June 2006 with 180 prints globally. Made on a budget of ₹11 crore (US$2.4 million), Vikramarkudu was commercially successful earning a distributors' share of 23 crore (US$5.1 million). The film was screened at the International Film Festival of India in the mainstream section.

Vikramarkudu was a breakthrough film for Anushka Shetty. The film was remade in Kannada as Veera Madakari (2009), in Tamil as Siruthai (2011), in Hindi as Rowdy Rathore (2012), in Indian Bengali as Bikram Singha (2012) and twice in Bangladeshi Bengali as Ulta Palta 69 (2007) and Action Jasmine (2015).

Plot
Atthili Satthi Babu (Ravi Teja) is a rookie thief in Hyderabad, who is crazy about performing daredevil acts. Once, he meet Neeraja, who is in Hyderabad to attend a marriage, and they falls in love immediately. Satthi Babu tells her the truth about him being a thief and resolves to give up crime forever. But before that, he decides to swindle one last person for a large sum of money along with his uncle Duvva. He tricks a woman at a bus stand and flees with a trunk. This leads Satthi Babu to Neha, a young girl who was in the trunk instead of the wealth he thought was in the trunk, who thinks that Satthi Babu is her father. Flummoxed by what is happening, but forced to keep Neha with her as a police officer Inspector Mahanti keeps his eye on him.

Although he tries keeping Neha away from Neeraja's eyes, the latter finds out about Neha. Angry and hurt, Neeraja leaves for her place, leaving Satthi Babu heartbroken. Soon, unknown goons attack him, taking him to be  Superintendent of Police, Vikram Singh Rathore IPS (Ravi Teja), Neha's real father. Rathore looks exactly like Satthi Babu, which had caused all the confusion. While many unknown people help Satthi Babu run to safety with Neha in his arms, he is soon surrounded by the goons. It is then that Rathore makes an appearance and saves the day killing every goon by himself, but he soon dies suffering from injuries.

The other policemen who had assisted the SP then inform Satthi Babu of the whole incident. In Chambal village of Devgarh, Madhya Pradesh, the slain, and corrupt local M. L. A. Bavuji, a borderline psychopath, engulfs the town with his political corruption, illegal activities, criminal nexus, rape, and money laundering. His son Munna indulges in abusing women and raping the wives of policemen. Rathore immediately arrests him but he (Munna) is released by stating that he is mentally insane with the help of Home Minister. Later at a party organised by Bavuji (even Home minister comes to the party), Munna humiliates the police by removing their clothes but was killed by Rathore (intelligently) when he was hung from a tree by the belt of a humiliated inspector. After a few days, Rathore was attacked by Bavuji's brother Titla on Holi, where he was stabbed from the back as well as shot in the head while trying to save a village child and was assumed to be dead. But he survives with a brain injury, although the goons assumed that he is dead. Effects of this brain injury are later visible, and these effects are diminished by water falling on his head.

After knowing the incidents, Satthi Babu then adopts Neha, who does not know that her real father is dead. Then Satthi Babu returns to Devgarh posing as Rathore, and heads to settle the scores with Bavuji. Duvva tells Neeraja the truth, and she forgives Satthi Babu. Satthi Babu, being a goon, handles Bavuji well with tricks. He sets the MLA's wine factory afire and makes the villagers rob his food store. In the ensuing fight, he single-handedly defeats all of Bavuji's men. In the end, he fights with Titla on a rope bridge. Satthi Babu ties and cuts the rope, and Titla falls to death. Satthi Babu marries Neeraja, and they leave for a new life with Neha and Duvva.

Cast

Production
The shooting was disrupted by quarry workers who started pelting the film's unit with stones, damaging most of the equipment and injuring some of the film crew, including the director Rajamouli. The quarry workers were asked, by the quarry manager, to stop their work and leave the area, for the shooting of particular scenes. What started as a small miff between the manager and the workers escalated with the workers showering stones, even as the film crew was leaving the quarry in their vehicles. The injured crew members were admitted to Apollo hospital. Director Rajamouli suffered a hairline fracture to his hand. A formal complaint was lodged against the quarry workers and its owner.

Music

The audio of Vikramarkudu was launched at a function arranged in a set erected near Hitec city on the night of 31 May. K Raghavendra Rao launched the audio and gave the first unit to YVS Chowdary. Ramesh Prasad, B Gopal and Gunnam Gangaraju were also invited as guests. The unit members who were present include ML Kumar Chowdary, Ravi Teja, Rajamouli, Anushka, Keeravani, Vijayendra Prasad, Brahmanandam, lyricist Danayya, Rajiv Kanakala, Ajay, Rama Rajamouli, Ravindra, Sarvesh Murari, Ram Lakshman, M Ratnam, Kotagiri Venkateswara Rao and Suresh Bujji. Suma anchored the event and Aditya Music bought audio rights.

The soundtrack received a very good response from the public as well as critics. The song "College Papala" (well known as Chinta Ta Chita Chita) was reused by Sajid–Wajid in the Hindi remake of this film, Rowdy Rathore and also by M. M. Keeravani in the Kannada remake film Veera Madakari

Reception

Box office
The film was commercially successful and was one of the highest grossers of Telugu cinema in 2006. and a theatrical run of 100 days in 54 centres.  Vikramarkudu earned a distributors' share of {INR}19 crore (US$4.2 million) and worldwide gross collections of over 25 crore (US$5.5 million).

Critical response
It received positive reviews from critics. Idlebrain wrote: "On a whole, Vikramarkudu is another prospective blockbuster from the stable of Rajamouli". Totaltollywood wrote: "First half of the film goes in full entertainment mode. Second half gets into action part but the entertainment values are maintained at the same level.". Sify wrote: "On the whole, Vikramarkudu is a masala entertainer and is OK timepass fare.". Nowrunning wrote: "Watching Vikramarkudu is like eating a plate of Mirchi Bhajji from the roadside pushcart.". Fullhyd wrote: "Vikramarkudu is like one of those dishes that smell great during cooking, but just don’t taste the same way in the end. The film assiduously builds its story to a crest with your adrenaline pumping on all cylinders, but doesn’t quite know how to handle it thereon.". Cinegoer wrote: "One thing is that Vikramarkudu never bores you. It will keep you glued to the screen, because so many things happen all the time and the narrative moves quickly.".

Other versions 
The film was dubbed into Malayalam, Hindi, and Bhojpuri as Vikramathithya, Pratighat: A Revenge in 2007, and Vikram Singh Rathod IPS in 2011 respectively. It was also remade twice in Bangladeshi Bengali as Ulta Palta 69 and Action Jasmine, in Kannada as Veera Madakari, in Tamil as Siruthai, in Hindi as Rowdy Rathore, and in Indian Bengali as Bikram Singha: The Lion Is Back.

Sequel
In September 2021, V. Vijayendra Prasad began writing the film's sequel, and Sampath Nandi entered into talks for directing it.

Notes

References

External links
 

2006 films
2000s Telugu-language films
Films scored by M. M. Keeravani
Fictional portrayals of the Andhra Pradesh Police
Indian action films
Films about lookalikes
2000s masala films
Telugu films remade in other languages
Films directed by S. S. Rajamouli
Indian police films
2006 action films
2000s police films